Makueni Constituency is an electoral constituency in Kenya. It is one of six constituencies in Makueni County. The constituency was established for the 1966 elections.Its current MP is Daniel Kitonga Maanzo of Wiper party who is also vying for Makueni Senate .

Members of Parliament

Wards 
Makueni Constituency is an electoral constituency number 086.
It comprises the following county assembly wards.
Wote Ward (County Assembly Ward No. 0424 comprises Nziu, Unoa, and Kamunyolo Sub - Locations of Makueni County.
Muvau/Kikumini Ward (County Assembly Ward No. 0425) comprises Kikumini, Kambimawe, Mumbuni, Muvau, Itaa and Kitonyoni Sub - Locations of Makueni County.
Mavindini Ward (County Assembly Ward No. 0426) comprises Yekanga, Kanthuni, Ivinganzia, Mavindini, Muusini, Kiunoni and katithi Sub - Locations of Makueni County.
Kitise/Kithuki Ward (County Assembly Ward No. 0427) comprises Mwania, Kitise, Kimundi, Kithuki and Yinthungu Sub - Locations of Makueni County.
Kathonzweni Ward (County Assembly Ward No. 0428) comprises Kiangini, Kituluni, Kwa Kavisi, Thavu, Ituka and Kavingoni Sub - Locations of Makueni County.
Nzaui/Kalamba (County Assembly Ward No. 0429)
Mbitini (County Assembly Ward No. 0430)

References 

Constituencies in Makueni County
Constituencies in Eastern Province (Kenya)
1966 establishments in Kenya
Constituencies established in 1966